Kožulj is a Serbo-Croatian surname. Notable people with the surname include:

Gordan Kožulj (born 1976), Croatian swimmer 
Zvonimir Kožulj (born 1993), Bosnian football midfielder

See also
Kožul

Croatian surnames
Serbian surnames